Diane Towler MBE married Green, (born 16 December 1946) is an English former ice dancer and currently a figure skating coach. She is a four-time (1966–1969) World and European champion with skating partner Bernard Ford.

Personal life
Diane Towler-Green was born 16 December 1946 in Kensington, London. She is the mother of ice dancers Candice Towler-Green and Phillipa Towler-Green, and the aunt of Mark Bosley.

Career
Towler was partnered with Bernard Ford by the duo's coach, Gladys Hogg. The two debuted at the World Championships in 1964, finishing 13th. In 1965, they finished just off the podium in 4th. Towler/Ford won gold at the 1966 European Championships and went on to win their first World title. They would win the World and European titles for four consecutive seasons.

At the 1968 Winter Olympics, Towler/Ford skated in a demonstration event for ice dancing, winning the gold medal. Ice dancing became an official part of the Winter Olympics in 1976.

Towler/Ford are MBE recipients and were inducted into the World Figure skating Hall of Fame in Colorado Springs in 1993. Their best-known program was skated to Zorba the Greek. After retiring from amateur competition, they performed in ice shows until Ford moved to Canada.

Towler became a figure skating coach. Her ice dancing students include:
 Janet Sawbridge / Peter Dalby (1972 Europeans bronze medalists)
 Candice Towler-Green / James Phillipson
 Phillipa Towler-Green / Phillip Poole, both British Junior champions and world competitors
 Debbie Burne / Mark Bosley, British junior champions and 5th at Junior Worlds 
 Elizabeth Coates / Alan Abretti who competed at the World and European Championships
 Ashlie Slatter / Atl Ongay-Pérez, youngest British National Junior silver medalists,  Junior Grand Prix 2022 competitors, and Junior Worlds 2023 competitors

Results
(with Ford)

References

External links
 Skatabase: 1960-1969 Worlds: Ice Dancing Results
 Skatabase: 1960-1969 Europeans: Ice Dancing Results

1946 births
Living people
English female ice dancers
British figure skating coaches
World Figure Skating Championships medalists
European Figure Skating Championships medalists
Female sports coaches